Galatella is a genus of flowering plants in the family Asteraceae, native to Europe, Asia, and northern Africa.

Species
, The Plant List accepts the following species:

 hybrids
 Galatella × sublinosyris Tzvelev
 Galatella × subtatarica Tzvelev
 Galatella × subvillosa Tzvelev

References

Asteraceae genera
Astereae